DJ-Kicks: Smith & Mighty is a DJ mix album, mixed by Smith & Mighty. It was released on 9 March 1998 on the Studio !K7 independent record label as part of the DJ-Kicks series.

 CD Cat number: !K7065CD
 Vinyl Cat number: !K7065LP

Track listing
"Amid The Ether" (featuring Shandi I) – Blue & Red – 3:25
"Rwanda" (featuring Andy Scholes) – Smith & Mighty – 2:40
"Jah Pure & Clear" – Peter D – 2:48
"Walk On" – Smith & Mighty – 3:12
"Same" – Smith & Mighty – 3:15
"Quite Frankly" – DJ Lynx – 3:45
"Mr. A&R Man" – Steve Wilks – 3:44
"Irrational" – Receiver – 1:39
"Anyone" (featuring Jacki Jackson) – Smith & Mighty – 3:46
"Night Fall" – More Rockers – 3:26
"First Time" (More Rockers remix) – On – 2:28
"Sole Sentiment" – Ratman – 2:40
"Higher Dub" – Smith & Mighty – 2:07
"Never Felt This Way" – More Rockers – 2:40
"Sound Boy" – More Rockers – 2:56
"Show Love" – More Rockers – 3:17
"Rainbows" (More Rockers Remix) – Virginia – 3:42
"New World" – Flynn & Flora – 3:34
"Off The Edge" – Jaz Klash – 1:18
"Bass Speaker" (DJ Krust Remix) – Flynn & Flora – 3:11
"1-2-3 Break" – More Rockers – 2:59
"Tripitaka" – Wraparound Sounds – 2:27
"Vibrations" – Gang Related – 3:11
"DJ-Kicks"/"I Don't Know" (featuringAlice Perera) – Smith & Mighty – 3:41

References

External links 
DJ-Kicks website

DJ-Kicks albums
Smith & Mighty albums
1998 compilation albums